Iola Township is one of twelve townships in Allen County, Kansas, United States. As of the 2010 census, its population was 830.

Geography
According to the USGS, it contains three cemeteries: Highland, Iola and Iola.

The streams of Coon Creek, Deer Creek, Elm Creek and Rock Creek run through this township.

Transportation
Iola Township contains three airports or landing strips: Allen County Airport, Allen County Hospital Airport and Womack Airport.

References
 USGS Geographic Names Information System (GNIS)

External links
 US-Counties.com
 City-Data.com

Townships in Allen County, Kansas
Townships in Kansas